Donna McPhail is a British journalist, and was formerly a television presenter and stand-up comedian.

McPhail is from London and was noted for her stand-up comedy in the 1990s, most prominently in her nomination for the Perrier Comedy Award in 1993.

McPhail hosted BBC Two's The Sunday Show (1995–1996), a studio-based comedy programme which also starred Katie Puckrik, Paul Kaye (in his Dennis Pennis persona) and Paul Tonkinson.

McPhail, who is regarded as an outspoken "laddette" lesbian, now writes a monthly column for Diva, the UK's bestselling magazine for lesbians.

Television appearances
 StandUp (Granada Television)
 The Comedy Club (London Weekend Television)
 Have I Got News for You (BBC)
 Without Walls (Channel 4)
 Edinburgh Nights (BBC)
 Reportage (BBC)
 Just For Laughs (Channel 4 & CBC)
 The Stand-Up Show (BBC)
 Never Mind The Buzzcocks (BBC)

Radio credits
 Loose Ends (BBC Radio 4)
 Loose Talk (BBC Radio 1)
 Room 101 (BBC Radio 5)
 The Mark Radcliffe Show (BBC Radio 1)
 Woman's Hour (BBC Radio 4)
 Missed Demeanours (BBC Radio 4)
 Currently presents her own show on GLR.
 Co-wrote and presented two series of Windbags with Jo Brand for BBC Radio 1.
 The Mary Whitehouse Experience (BBC Radio 1)

Stand-up comedy
Melbourne Comedy Festival.
Montreal Just For Laughs Festival
Edinburgh Fringe Festival.
A nationwide tour in spring 1996, that culminated in two sell-out performances at the Duke of York Theatre in London.

References

External links
 

English stand-up comedians
English women comedians
Lesbian comedians
Lesbian journalists
English LGBT comedians
English LGBT journalists
Living people
Comedians from London
20th-century English comedians
21st-century English comedians
1962 births
21st-century LGBT people